Mikhaylovka is a rural locality (a settlement) in Medvedevskoye Rural Settlement, Totemsky District, Vologda Oblast, Russia. The population was 342 as of 2002.

Geography 
Neklyudikha is located 52 km northeast of Totma (the district's administrative centre) by road. Nizhnyaya Pechenga is the nearest rural locality.

References 

Rural localities in Tarnogsky District